Töpfer, also spelled as Toepfer, is a German surname meaning potter.

People 
 Alfred Toepfer (1894–1993), German entrepreneur, founder of Alfred Toepfer Stiftung F.V.S.
 Ernst Toepfer (1877–1955), German painter
 Johann Gottlob Töpfer (1791–1870), German organist
 Klaus Töpfer (born 1938), German politician
 Reinhard Töpfer, author
 Tomáš Töpfer (born 1951), Czech actor and politician

See also  
 Potter (surname) 

Occupational surnames